Lompoc–Surf station is a passenger rail station in Surf, California, west of the city of Lompoc. It is served by Amtrak's Pacific Surfliner from San Luis Obispo to San Diego.  Four daily Pacific Surfliner trains serve the station (two in each direction). The station opened for service on March 18, 2000.

References

External links 

Amtrak stations in Santa Barbara County, California
Lompoc, California
2000 establishments in California
Railway stations in the United States opened in 2000